The old First Baptist Church, founded in 1884,  is a church building located on East Wade Street at Northeast 2nd Street in Trenton, Gilchrist County, Florida. It was built with a raised main floor so that its basement could have full size above ground windows. The church plant has been expanded behind it to the north and to the east. Today it is no longer the primary building for the active congregation. 

In 1989, the 1920s First Baptist Church building was listed in A Guide to Florida's Historic Architecture, published by the University of Florida Press.

References

External links

Churches in Gilchrist County, Florida
Churches completed in 1943
Baptist churches in Florida
1943 establishments in Florida